Lucas Oluoch Ndandason (born 7 August 1991) is a Kenyan cricketer. Domestically, he previously represented Nairobi Gymkhana Club, but from the 2011 season, he is playing for Coast Pekee in the East African tournaments.

Oluoch's elder brother, Nick Oluoch is a wicketkeeper who plays for Kongonis in the East African tournaments.

International career
After impressing for the Gymkhana Club, Oluoch first got a call-up to the national side during Kenya's home series against Uganda, where they played 3 List A matches in the end of 2010. Oluoch impressed greatly on his official List A debut, taking an impressive 4 wickets for 32 runs, currently his best bowling figures at the List A level. As a result, the Ugandans were bowled out for 123. Kenya eventually took the series 2–1.

Oluoch made it to Kenya's provisional squad for the 2011 Cricket World Cup, but eventually did not make it to the final 15-member squad.

After a dismal World Cup campaign in which the team lost all of their matches, the selectors axed the under-performing seniors, and put into place a performance-based contracts. Oluoch met that high-performance criteria, and was thus offered a central contract, a high honour, by the board.

As a number of players refused contracts offered by the board and left, Oluoch was one of thirteen players who accepted contracts and remained with the governing body. With Cricket Kenya deciding to leave out players who refused contracts, Oluoch received a call-up to play in the team's Intercontinental Cup and Intercontinental Cup One-Day matches against Netherlands to be held away from home.

He made his official One-Day International (ODI) debut against the Dutch at Voorburg in that series (the matches he played against Uganda was only given List A status because Uganda was not an ODI cricket playing nation at that time). He took an impressive three wickets on debut.

After an impressive performance in the Netherlands, he was selected in Kenya's home series against the United Arab Emirates. He made his first-class cricket in the ICC Intercontinental Cup at Mombasa Sports Club. Oluoch took a handsome 6/121 on debut, but UAE won the match by 266 runs. Captain Collins Obuya's determined 62 could not prevent the hosts from defeat.

Following that, as a part of Kenya's preparations for the 2012 ICC World Twenty20 Qualifier, the board announced that the team would play seven unofficial Twenty20 matches in Namibia, followed by games against Zimbabwean franchise teams. Kenya could not manage much on that tour of Namibia, being defeated 6–2, but Oluoch did have an extraordinary T20 game against Namibia in which he took incredible figures of 4 wickets for 6 runs. Namibia were bowled out for 108, but unfortunately, Kenya were bowled out for an even lower 63 all out as the Namibians romped home by 45 runs.

In January 2018, he was named in Kenya's squad for the 2018 ICC World Cricket League Division Two tournament. In September 2018, he was named in Kenya's squad for the 2018 Africa T20 Cup.

In May 2019, he was named in Kenya's squad for the Regional Finals of the 2018–19 ICC T20 World Cup Africa Qualifier tournament in Uganda. In September 2019, he was named in Kenya's squad for the 2019 ICC T20 World Cup Qualifier tournament in the United Arab Emirates. In November 2019, he was named in Kenya's squad for the Cricket World Cup Challenge League B tournament in Oman.

References

External links 

1991 births
Living people
Kenyan cricketers
Kenya One Day International cricketers
Kenya Twenty20 International cricketers